Yicheng (2 February 1927 – 21 December 2017) was a Chinese Buddhist monk, Chan master and religious leader. Yicheng was best known as Venerable Master of the Buddhist Association of China.

Early life
Yicheng was born Zhou Yunsheng into a family of farming background in Wangcheng County, Changsha, Hunan, during the Republic of China. 

He studied rockwork and architecture under his father when he was ten years old.

Religious life
At age 15, he paid a religious homage to Wushan Temple and wrote a Gatha when he stood in front of the statue of Gautama Buddha.

In June 1949, Yicheng took refuge in the Three Jewels under master Mingxin in Xixin Chan Temple, and received complete ordination under Xuyun in the winter of 1956, as the 10th generation of the Guiyang school and the 45th generation of the Linji school, in Nanhua Temple, Shaoguan, south China's Guangdong province.

In 1956, he entered the Research Institute of Buddhist Studies, which was founded by Hsu Yun and where Haideng taught.

In 1966, the Cultural Revolution was launched by Mao Zedong, he was transferred to a reclamation farm in Yunjushan as a farmer, until the end of 1978. According to the national policy of free religious belief, he regained his identity as a monk.

In the Spring of 1979, he resided in Zhenru Chan Temple, where he served as its abbot since 1985.

In 1986, Yicheng became the president of the Buddhist Association of Yongxiu County and the president of the Buddhist Association of Jiangxi.

In September 2002, he was elected Venerable Master of the Buddhist Association of China, a position he held for almost eight years.

In September 2003, he served as abbot of Fayuan Temple.

Yicheng won the Confucius Peace Prize in 2013.

Yicheng died in Zhenru Chan Temple, Jiangxi, on December 21, 2017.

Works

References

External links

1927 births
2017 deaths
Republic of China Buddhists
Rinzai Buddhists
Writers from Changsha
People's Republic of China Buddhist monks
People's Republic of China writers
Chinese spiritual writers
Religious leaders in China